Foremost Airport  is located  west of Foremost, Alberta, Canada.

References

External links
Page about this airport on COPA's Places to Fly airport directory

County of Forty Mile No. 8
Registered aerodromes in Alberta